Parcoblatta is a genus of 12 species of native North American wood cockroaches. The males often have wings and are drawn to lights, while the females are flightless.

References

External links

Cockroach genera